The 2013 Larry H. Miller Tour of Utah is the tenth edition of the Tour of Utah. Once again, the race was included on the UCI America Tour, with a UCI classification of 2.1. As such, the race is only open to teams on the UCI Pro Tour, UCI Professional Continental and UCI Continental circuits.  The race took place between August 6–11, 2013 as a six-day, six-stage race, with some major differences to the prior editions, such as the elimination of the prologue, individual time trial, or team time trial. The 2013 Tour of Utah was one of six UCI-ranked stage races in the United States in 2013.

After finishing high overall in previous editions, American Tom Danielson of  won the overall title.

Teams

In July, the Tour of Utah announced a sixteen-team field, made up of five UCI ProTeams (down from six), three UCI Professional Continental teams (down from five) and eight UCI Continental teams (up from six), thus giving the race a total of sixteen-teams (down from seventeen). The remaining eleven teams are based in the United States.

UCI ProTeams
  *
  *
  *
 
  *

UCI Professional Continental Teams
  *
 
  *

(* – participated in 2012)

UCI Continental Teams
  *
  *
  *
 
 Hincapie Sportswear Development Team
 
 
  *

Contenders

Defending champion Johann Tschopp of Switzerland will not defend his title.

Stages

Stage 1
August 6, 2013 – Brian Head to Cedar City, Hilly stage, 
For the second consecutive time, the Tour of Utah started with a full stage instead of a prologue. Although the route included two categorized climbs, a sizable peloton of a hundred returned to downtown Cedar City.

Stage 2
August 7, 2013 – Panguitch to Torrey, Medium mountain stage,

Stage 3
August 8, 2013 – Richfield to Payson, Medium mountain stage,

Stage 4
August 9, 2013 – Salt Lake City to Salt Lake City, Flat stage,

Stage 5
August 10, 2013 – Snowbasin – Snowbird, Mountain stage,

Stage 6
August 11, 2013 – Park City – Park City, Mountain stage,

Classification leadership

In the 2013 Tour of Utah, five jerseys are awarded. For the general classification, calculated by adding the finishing times of the stages per cyclist, the leader receives a yellow jersey (Larry H. Miller Dealerships Leader Jersey). This classification is considered the most important of the Tour of Utah, and the winner of the general classification will be considered the winner of the event.

Additionally, there is also a sprints classification, akin to what is called the points classification in other races, which awards a purple jersey (Xo Communications Sprint Jersey). In the sprints classification, cyclists receive points for finishing in the top twenty in a stage. In addition, some points can be won in intermediate sprints.

There is also a mountains classification, which awards a white jersey (Ski Utah King of the Mountain Jersey). In the mountains classifications, points are won by reaching the top of a mountain before other cyclists. Each climb is categorized, either first, second, third, or fourth category, with more points available for the harder climbs.

There is also a youth classification. This classification is calculated the same way as the general classification, but only young cyclists (under 23) are included. The leader of the young rider classification receives a blue jersey (Subaru Best Young Rider Jersey).

The last jersey is awarded to the most aggressive rider of a stage for him to wear on the next stage. It is generally awarded to a rider who attacks constantly or spends a lot of time in the breakaways. This jersey is orange (Vivint Most Aggressive Rider Jersey).

There is also a classification for teams. In this classification, the times of the best three cyclists per stage are added, and the team with the lowest time is the leader.

Classification standings

General classification

Points classification

King of the Mountains classification

Young riders classification

Team classification

References

External links

Tour of Utah
Tour of Utah
Tour of Utah
2013 in sports in Utah
August 2013 sports events in the United States